Ghazi is an administrative subdivision of Haripur District in Khyber Pakhtunkhwa province of Pakistan. Assistant Commissioner of Ghazi is Fizza Mohsin. She started her service on 24 February 2022. 

A number of villages located in Ghazi's midst are Hassanpur, Essa, Khalo, Pipliala, Khairbara, Kohtehra and Hamlet Colony.
Villages
Bhai
Bharwasa
Isa
Jalu
Khalo
SalamKhand
Gahara*
Jammun
Sobra
Pipliala

References

Union councils of Haripur District